Merry Christmas from Sesame Street  is a children's Christmas album featuring characters from Sesame Street and released in 1975 by the Children's Television Workshop and Children's Records of America (#CTW 25516).  The album was nominated for the 1976 Grammy Awards, but lost to another Sesame Street album, Bert & Ernie Sing-Along.

Cast
 Northern Calloway as David
 Emilio Delgado as Luis
 Will Lee as Mr. Hooper
 Loretta Long as Susan; Smart Tina
 Sonia Manzano as Maria
 Bob McGrath as Bob
 Roscoe Orman as Gordon; Hardhead Henry Harris
 Caroll Spinney as Big Bird; Oscar the Grouch
 Frank Oz as Cookie Monster; Grover; Bert
 Jerry Nelson as The Count; Herry Monster; Snuffle-upagus
 Fran Brill as Prairie Dawn
 Jim Henson as Ernie

Album

References

1975 Christmas albums
Sesame Street albums
Christmas albums by American artists